Pseudhyrax is an extinct genus of archaeohyracid notoungulate. It lived from the Late Eocene to the Early Oligocene, of what is now South America.

Description

This animal was approximately the size of a modern raccoon, and its skull was approximately 13 centimeters long. The length of its body, excluding the tail, was approximately 65–75 centimeters, and it weighed around 7–9 kilograms. Pseudhyrax had a low and elongated skull, mainly characterized by its dentition. The premolars and molars of Pseudhyrax were particularly high-crowned (hypsodont).

Classification

The genus Pseudhyrax was first described in 1901 by Florentino Ameghino, based on fossil remains found in Argentina in terrains dated from the Late Eocene. The type species is Pseudhyrax eutrachytheroides, and the species P. strangulatus was also named by Ameghino. The name Pseudhyrax ("false hyrax") reflects Ameghino's belief that this animal was related to hyraxes, due to the shape of its skull. The species name of the type species, eutrachytheroides, means "similar to Eutrachytherus", another genus of notoungulate currently considered as a synonym of Trachytherus.

Pseudhyrax is traditionally considered a member of Archaeohyracidae, a clade of Notoungulates sharing similarities with the modern rock hyrax, but larger in size and with hypsodont teeth. The family Archaeohyracidae, however, may be paraphyletic, and some of its members may be basal to other groups of Typotheres.

Paleoecology

Pseudhyrax was a terrestrial animal, probably fast and agile, and perhaps social. It was herbivorous and its high-crowned premolars and molars indicates that it was able to feed on hard and abrasive plants in open areas.

Bibliography

F. Ameghino. 1901. Notices préliminaires sur des ongulés nouveaux des terrains crétacés de Patagonie [Preliminary notes on new ungulates from the Cretaceous terrains of Patagonia]. Boletin de la Academia Nacional de Ciencias de Córdoba 16:349-429
G. G. Simpson. 1967. The beginning of the age of mammals in South America. Part II. Bulletin of the American Museum of Natural History 137:1-260
M. A. Reguero and F. J. Prevosti. 2010. Rodent-like notoungulates (Typotheria) from Gran Barranca, Chubut Province, Argentina: phylogeny and systematics. In R. H. Madden, A. A. Carlini, M. G. Vucetich, R. F. Kay (eds.), The Paleontology of Gran Barranca: Evolution and Environmental Change through the Middle Cenozoic of Patagonia 148–165

References 

Typotheres
Eocene genus first appearances
Oligocene extinctions
Eocene mammals of South America
Oligocene mammals of South America
Paleogene Argentina
Fossils of Argentina
Paleogene Chile
Fossils of Chile
Fossil taxa described in 1901
Taxa named by Florentino Ameghino
Prehistoric placental genera
Golfo San Jorge Basin
Sarmiento Formation